Tārīkh-i Jahāngushāy ( "The History of The World Conqueror") or Tārīkh-i Jahāngushāy-i Juwaynī is a detailed historical account written by the Persian Ata-Malik Juvayni describing the Mongol, Hulegu Khan, and Ilkhanid conquest of Persia as well as the history of Isma'ilis. It is considered an invaluable work of Persian literature.

This account of the Mongol invasions of his homeland Iran, written based on survivor accounts, is one of the main sources on the rapid sweep of Genghis Khan's armies through the nomadic tribes of Tajikistan and the 
established cities of the Silk Road including Otrar, Bukhara, and Samarkand in 1219, and successive campaigns until Genghis Khan's death in 1227 and beyond.

His writing is sometimes inflated, as when he estimates the strength of the Mongol army at 700,000, against other accounts that put the number between 105,000 and 130,000. His descriptions are often written from a sense of drama: of the fall of Assassin castle Maymun-Diz in November 1256, where he was present at the siege, he describes the effect of 
trebuchet (catapult) bombardment on the battlements:

The first stones which were discharged from them broke the defenders' trebuchet and many were crushed under it.  Fear of the quarrels from the crossbows overcame them so that they were in a complete panic and tried to make shields out of veils [i.e. they did best to defend with very indadequate equipment.]  Some who were standing on towers crept in their terror like mice into holes or fled like lizards into the crannies of the rocks.

Juvayni's descriptions are, however, a very valuable resource for contemporary Mongol history, along with the work of Rashid al-Din, and the Secret History of the Mongols.

In a  the whole army rounded up all the animals over a large region, in order to obtain dried meat before the onset of winter. Once rounded up, the animals were ruthlessly massacred, first by the Khan, then by princes, and finally, only after so commanded, by all the army. This was to form a model for the ruthlessness of Mongol attacks on well-established human settlements. The painting of Khubilai Khan and his Khatun Chabi who was childless however would show an average hunt with slow-moving horses and watching for quarry. 

The sadistic scene envisioned by Juvaini wherein crowded animals of all types seek to flee, seems too close to the promised biblical Day of Judgement, since lions would have attacked oxen. Nonetheless it is likely that Hulagu Khan and his Christian Khatun Doqez increased hunting due to their Latin allies, who also may have impeded Mongol victory at Ain Jalut.
An account of the tragic failure of a Chinese student - (Jiang Rong: "The Wolf") - to save a wild wolf of a type formerly hunted by the historical Mongol people and their descendants still today, would indicate wolves were targeted by such hunts as traditional methods of the ravaging wolves in imminent danger of extinction were described. Snow leopards and others were also likely to have been hunted.
It is reported in "Mongol Warrior 1200-1350" by Stephen Turnbull and Wayne Reynolds that the Mongols ate horse milk powder with water, around 250 grammes a day although an account they quote mentions they took 4.5 kg along for an expedition, and claims they hunted on campaign, such as digging around for marmots, it also said they ate horse meat (it is known that the wild Przewalski horses were eaten which contributed to their extinction, but that may have been due to food shortage and was later than the period of the historical Mongols when possibly even these horses were some of them still domestic), on the other hand they also drank blood from their horses by temporarily opening a vein when in shortage. However it is also stated that they failed at times to prevent their horses from dying of hunger.
However, William of Rubruck, reports a more moderate but identical style of hunting specifically of the Tatars, thus Juvaini could still be exaggerating.

After the fall of Merv, the people were rounded up and distributed among the soldiers in tens, hundreds and thousands, and each man in the remaining Mongol army was assigned the execution of "three to four hundred people."  However, there is no doubt that this type of
savagery was part of the terror spread by the Mongol army.

References

 Mongols, Huns, and Vikings, by Hugh Kennedy, 2002.

External links
 

Military history of the Mongol Empire
Medieval Persian literature